The 2018 Pakistani provincial elections may refer to:

2018 Balochistan provincial election
2018 Khyber Pakhtunkhwa provincial election
2018 Punjab provincial election
2018 Sindh provincial election

2018 elections in Pakistan
Provincial elections in Pakistan